Alcona Township is a civil township of Alcona County in the U.S. state of Michigan. The population was 965 at the 2020 census.

Communities
The community was settled as early as 1849 by William Cullings and was named after the Black River. It was a fishing village first inhabited by French trappers and fishermen. It became a lumbering center when the Alger, Smith & Company operated in Black River from 1876–1880. Black River became the largest pine timber producer in the world before turning back into a fishing village with the decline of the lumber industry. A post office opened in Black River on February 9, 1877. It was renamed as Blackriver in 1894 and back to Black River in 1955. Black River uses the 48721 ZIP Code, which serves the eastern portion of Alcona Township and smaller areas of Haynes Township to the south.     
It should not be confused with another nearby community named Hubbard Lake just to the north in Alpena County.
Larson Beach is an unincorporated community located at  within the CDP of Hubbard Lake.

Geography

The southern portion of Negwegon State Park is located within the township, and it extends north into Alpena County.  Portions of the township are also included in the Huron National Forest.  The township has a coastline along Lake Huron and also includes Black River and part of Hubbard Lake

Major highways
 runs along the eastern portion of the township near Lake Huron.
 is a county-designated highway in the township.

Demographics

As of the census of 2000, there were 1,089 people, 524 households, and 361 families residing in the township.  The population density was 18.9 per square mile (7.3/km).  There were 1,313 housing units at an average density of 22.8 per square mile (8.8/km).  The racial makeup of the township was 97.89% White, 0.83% Native American, 0.09% Asian, 0.18% from other races, and 1.01% from two or more races. Hispanic or Latino of any race were 0.73% of the population. 20.1% were of German, 15.1% English, 10.9% French, 10.8% Polish, 7.3% Irish and 6.9% French Canadian ancestry.

There were 524 households, out of which 14.9% had children under the age of 18 living with them, 63.2% were married couples living together, 2.7% had a female householder with no husband present, and 31.1% were non-families. 29.4% of all households were made up of individuals, and 18.7% had someone living alone who was 65 years of age or older.  The average household size was 2.08 and the average family size was 2.50.

In the township the population was spread out, with 14.4% under the age of 18, 3.6% from 18 to 24, 16.5% from 25 to 44, 30.9% from 45 to 64, and 34.5% who were 65 years of age or older.  The median age was 58 years. For every 100 females, there were 105.5 males.  For every 100 females age 18 and over, there were 103.5 males.

The median income for a household in the township was $34,125, and the median income for a family was $39,934. Males had a median income of $33,250 versus $21,364 for females. The per capita income for the township was $20,160.  About 4.3% of families and 8.7% of the population were below the poverty line, including 17.1% of those under age 18 and 4.9% of those age 65 or over.

Education
Alcona Township is served entirely by Alcona Community Schools.

References

External links
 Alcona Township official website

Townships in Alcona County, Michigan
Townships in Michigan
Populated places on Lake Huron in the United States